The Mystic Hour is a 1933 American mystery film directed by  Melville De Lay and starring Charles Hutchison, Lucille Powers and Montagu Love. It is also known by the alternative title of At Twelve Midnight. The film was one of the earliest releases of the Poverty Row studio Reliable Pictures. The movie is about the Fox, a famous burglar who masquerades as a private investigator.

Cast
 Charles Hutchison as Robert Randall  
 Lucille Powers as Mary Marshall  
 Montagu Love as Captain James alias The Fox  
 Charles Middleton as Roger Thurston  
 Edith Thornton as Myra Marshall  
 Eddie Phillips as Bradley Thurston  
 Jimmy Aubrey as Blinkey

References

External links
 

1933 films
1933 mystery films
American mystery films
Reliable Pictures films
American black-and-white films
1930s English-language films
1930s American films